In 1962, the United States FBI, under Director J. Edgar Hoover, continued for a thirteenth year to maintain a public list of the people it regarded as the Ten Most Wanted Fugitives.

Throughout the year 1962, seven of the ten places on the list remained filled by these elusive long-time fugitives from prior years, then still at large:

 1950 #14 (twelve years), Frederick J. Tenuto remained still at large
 1954 #78 (eight years), David Daniel Keegan remained still at large
 1956 #97 (six years), Eugene Francis Newman remained still at large
 1960 #137 (two years), Donald Leroy Payne remained still at large
 1960 #143 (two years), John B. Everhart remained still at large
 1961 #149 (one year), William Terry Nichols arrested April 30, 1962
 1961 #158 (one year), John Gibson Dillon remained still at large

By year end, the FBI had added another dozen fugitives to the list.

1962 fugitives
The Ten Most Wanted Fugitives listed by the FBI in 1962 include (in FBI list appearance sequence order):

Delbert Henry Linaweaver
January 30, 1962 #163
One week on the list
Delbert Henry Linaweaver - U.S. prisoner arrested February 5, 1962 in Floydada, Texas by the FBI after a citizen recognized him from a wanted flyer in a post office

Watson Young, Jr.
February 5, 1962 #164
One week on the list
Watson Young, Jr. - U.S. prisoner arrested February 12, 1962 in Salina, Kansas while driving an ambulance stolen from an area funeral home. In his pocket, Young had his identification order.

Lyndal Ray Smith
February 14, 1962 #165
One month on the list
Lyndal Ray Smith - U.S. prisoner surrendered March 22, 1962 in Baltimore, Maryland as a result of television and newspaper publicity

Harry Robert Grove, Jr.
February 19, 1962 #166
One year on the list
Harry Robert Grove, Jr. - U.S. prisoner arrested January 26, 1963 in Uhrichsville, Ohio by the Ohio State Highway Patrol after being observed loitering in a supermarket

Bobby Randell Wilcoxson
February 23, 1962 #167
Nine months on the list
Bobby Randell Wilcoxson - U.S. prisoner arrested November 10, 1962 in Baltimore, Maryland

Albert Frederick Nussbaum
April 2, 1962 #168
Seven months on the list
Albert Frederick Nussbaum - U.S. prisoner arrested November 4, 1962 in Buffalo, New York by the FBI after a 20-minute chase through downtown streets

Thomas Welton Holland
May 11, 1962 #169
Three weeks on the list
Thomas Welton Holland - U.S. prisoner arrested June 2, 1962 in La Harpe, Kansas by a police officer who recognized
him from a wanted flyer

Edward Howard Maps
June 15, 1962 #170
Five years on the list
Edward Howard Maps - PROCESS DISMISSED December 1, 1967  by local authorities in Scranton, Pennsylvania., and Maps has never been apprehended and is still wanted. Wanted for killing his wife and four-month-old daughter on January 21, 1962 in Stroudsburg, Pennsylvania and setting fire to the house.

David Stanley Jacubanis
November 21, 1962 #171
One week on the list
David Stanley Jacubanis - U.S. prisoner arrested on November 29, 1962 in Arlington, Vermont. After being paroled, he robbed $6,004 from a bank in Dedham, Massachusetts on March 27, 1962. Federal authorities issued arrest warrants for Jacubanis after a second robbery in North Smithfield, Rhode Island on April 5, 1962.

John Kinchloe DeJarnette
November 30, 1962 #172 
Four days on the list
John Kinchloe DeJarnette - U.S. prisoner arrested on December 3, 1962 in Hollywood, California.

Michael Joseph O'Connor
December 13, 1962 #173
Two weeks on the list
Michael Joseph O'Connor (fugitive) - U.S. prisoner arrested on December 28, 1962 in a New York City restaurant by FBI Agents after hiding out in a New York hotel.

John Lee Taylor
December 14, 1962 #174
One week on the list
John Lee Taylor - U.S. prisoner arrested on December 20, 1962 in Chicago, Illinois.

See also

Later entries
FBI Ten Most Wanted Fugitives, 2020s
FBI Ten Most Wanted Fugitives, 2010s
FBI Ten Most Wanted Fugitives, 2000s
FBI Ten Most Wanted Fugitives, 1990s
FBI Ten Most Wanted Fugitives, 1980s
FBI Ten Most Wanted Fugitives, 1970s
FBI Ten Most Wanted Fugitives, 1960s

Prior entries
FBI Ten Most Wanted Fugitives, 1950s

References

External links
Current FBI top ten most wanted fugitives at FBI site
FBI pdf source document listing all Ten Most Wanted year by year (removed by FBI)

 
1962 in the United States